Larry Ray Willis (born 1963-07-13) is a former Canadian Football League wide receiver who played 9 seasons for 5 different teams from 1986-1993, and a former Arena Football League offensive specialist who played for the Connecticut Coyotes in 1996, the New Jersey Gladiators from 1997-1998, and the Milwaukee Mustangs in 1999.

External links
AFL stats

1963 births
Living people
American football wide receivers
American football defensive backs
Canadian football wide receivers
Calgary Stampeders players
BC Lions players
Edmonton Elks players
Winnipeg Blue Bombers players
Toronto Argonauts players
Fresno State Bulldogs football players
Connecticut Coyotes players
New Jersey Gladiators players
Milwaukee Mustangs (1994–2001) players